Vanišovec is a nature reserve in the Slovak municipality of Šaštín-Stráže. It covers an area of 196 ha and has a protection level of 4 and 5.

References

Geography of Bratislava Region
Protected areas of Slovakia